HMS Sans Pareil was a 70-gun screw propelled ship of the line of the Royal Navy.

Planning and construction
Sans Pareil was initially designed as an 80-gun second rate, to the lines of the earlier HMS Sans Pareil, a French prize captured in 1794. She was ordered on 27 February 1843 and laid down on 1 September 1845 at Devonport Dockyard. The rapid development of naval technology during this period led to fears that she would be obsolete before she could be launched, and work was suspended on 2 October 1848. A new design was drawn up utilising steam power, which was approved on 18 May 1849, and the conversion was duly carried out. She was eventually launched on 18 March 1851, having cost a total of £126,432 to build, with the machinery costing another £30,888.

Career
Sans Pareil was commissioned at Plymouth on 12 November 1852, under the command of Sydney Dacres.  She was initially at Lisbon, but by 1853 was serving with the Channel Fleet. The outbreak of the Crimean War led to her being reassigned to the Black Sea. On 14 November 1854 she was driven ashore at Balaklava, Russia. on 22 November, Sans Pareil came under the command of Acting Captain Leopold Heath. He commanded her until February 1855, when Captain Woodford John Williams took over.  In September 1855 Sans Pareil was used to transport mortars to the Baltic.  Captain Astley Cooper Key took over on 9 January 1856, and was placed in charge of a division of gunboats.  After the end of the war Sans Pareil was used to return troops from the Crimea, and by March 1857, had been sent to the Far East.  Key and the Sans Pareil were present in China during the Second Opium War, with Key commanding the naval brigade at the capture of Canton on 28 December 1857.  Key was invalided back to Britain in April, and was replaced by Captain Julian Foulston Slight.  He was in turn replaced by Captain Rochfort Maguire, who remained in command until her return to Plymouth at the end of 1859.

Sans Pareil was recommissioned on 5 June 1862 under the command of Captain Arthur Parry Eardley-Wilmot, replacing HMS Nile as the Queenstown guardship.  In November 1861 she was used to transport troops to Mexico, along with HMS Donegal and HMS Conqueror.  Her final captain was George Le Geyt Bowyear, and Sans Pareil spent 1863 conveying marines to China, and returning invalids home.

Sans Pareil was reduced to 66 guns in 1866 and was sold to C. Marshall in March 1867. She was broken up at Plymouth.

Notes

References
 
 Lyon, David and Winfield, Rif, The Sail and Steam Navy List, All the Ships of the Royal Navy 1815–1889, pub Chatham, 2004, 
 Sans Pareil's career

External links
 

 

Ships of the line of the Royal Navy
1851 ships
Crimean War naval ships of the United Kingdom
Victorian-era ships of the line of the United Kingdom
Maritime incidents in November 1854